Komsomolets Island is the northernmost island of the Severnaya Zemlya group in the Russian Arctic, and the third largest island in the group. It is the 82nd largest island on earth. About 65% of the island is covered with glaciers, including Russia's largest, the Academy of Sciences Glacier.

Geography
Komsomolets Island is separated from October Revolution Island in the south by the Red Army Strait and from Pioneer Island in the southwest by the Yuny Strait. The northernmost point of the island is the Arctic Cape, the launching point for many Arctic expeditions.

Practically the whole of the central and southern part of the island is covered by the massive Academy of Sciences Glacier, between Krenkel Bay in the east and Zhuravlev Bay in the west. The northern part is largely unglaciated. The area of this island has been estimated at 9,006 km2. It rises to a height of 780 m.  Komsomolets Island is home to the largest ice cap in Russia, the Academy of Sciences Ice Cap.

Geology
The soil of the island is mostly composed of loose loam and sands, a tundra desert scattered with mosses and lichens.

History
The island was discovered by Boris Vilkitsky in 1913, but its insularity wasn't proven until 1931, when Georgy Ushakov and Nikolay Urvantsev charted the archipelago during their 1930–32 expedition. They also named it. In keeping with their tradition of naming the islands after events and movements of the Russian Revolution, this island was named in honour of the members of the Komsomol, the "Communist Union of Youth."

Photo gallery

References

External links

 Photos of the Academy of Science Ice Cap: 
 Facts and dramatic satellite photos of the islands of the Severnaya Zemlya group: 

Islands of the Laptev Sea
Islands of the Kara Sea
Komsomol
Islands of Severnaya Zemlya